Amanda Ripley is an American journalist and author.
She has covered high-profile topics for Time and other outlets, and she contributes to The Atlantic.
Her book The Smartest Kids in the World was a New York Times bestseller.

Biography
Amanda Ripley was born in Arizona and grew up in New Jersey. She graduated Phi Beta Kappa from Cornell University in 1996 with a B.A. in government.

After covering Capitol Hill for Congressional Quarterly, Ripley learned to write long-form feature stories under editor David Carr at the Washington City Paper. She then spent a decade working for Time magazine from New York, Washington and Paris. She covered the 9/11 terrorist attacks, the anthrax investigation and Hurricanes Katrina and Rita, helping Time win two National Magazine Awards. 

Ripley has written three investigative nonfiction books about human behavior, including The Smartest Kids in the World, a New York Times bestseller. In 2018, she became certified in conflict mediation and began training journalists to cover polarizing conflict differently, in partnership with the Solutions Journalism Network. Ripley writes op-eds for The Washington Post and feature articles for Politico and The Atlantic, where she is a contributing writer. She also hosts the "How To!" show for Slate.

She lives in Washington, D.C., with her husband. Her brother is the screenwriter Ben Ripley.

Works

Books 
2009. The Unthinkable: Who Survives when Disaster Strikes - and Why. New York : Arrow Books. , .
2014. The Smartest Kids in the World: And How They Got That Way. New York, NY : Simon & Schuster Paperbacks. , . NYT Hardcover Nonfiction Bestseller, September 22, 2013. 
2021. High Conflict: Why We Get Trapped and How We Get Out. New York, NY : Simon & Schuster. , .

Selected articles 
2010. "What Makes a Great Teacher?" The Atlantic. January/February issue. 
2013. "The Case Against High School Sports." The Atlantic. October issue. 
2016. "How America Outlawed Adolescence." The Atlantic. November issue. 
2018. "Complicating the Narratives." The Whole Story. 
2019. "The Least Politically Prejudiced Place in America." The Atlantic. 
2020. "We've Created Cartoonish Narratives About People in the Opposite Party. They're Not True." The Washington Post.
2022. "I stopped reading the news. Is the problem me — or the product?" The Washington Post.

References

External links

 
 
 
 "How to survive a disaster" Robert Crampton. The Times. June 21, 2008.
 Amanda Ripley articles in the Atlantic

Living people
Cornell University alumni
Time (magazine) people
American women journalists
20th-century American journalists
20th-century American non-fiction writers
20th-century American women writers
21st-century American journalists
21st-century American women writers
21st-century American non-fiction writers
American women non-fiction writers
The Atlantic (magazine) people
Journalists from Arizona
Journalists from New Jersey
Year of birth missing (living people)